A Heart Returns Home is a 1956 West German musical drama film directed by Eugen York and starring Maximilian Schell, Willy Birgel and Maria Holst. It was shot at the Wandsbek Studios in Hamburg and on location in Celle. The film's sets were designed by the art director Albrecht Becker and Herbert Kirchhoff.

Cast
 Maximilian Schell as Wolfgang Thomas
 Willy Birgel as Robert Lennart
 Maria Holst as Irene Thomas
 Hans Nielsen as Martin Thomas
 Erni Mangold as Maxie Mell
 Heinz Reincke as Besselmann
 Horst Beck as Journalist
 Hildegard Behrens-Kühn as Fräulein Kurtz
 Josef Dahmen as Dr. Brandel
 Erich Dunskus as Weber
 Sylvia Fitzen
 Albert Florath as Bürgermeister von Neuburg
 Horst Gnekow as Mangelsdorf
 Ursula Herking as Fräulein Snyder
 Hertha Martin as Sylvia Hartung
 Emmy Percy-Wüstenhagen as Gertrud
 Charles Regnier as Boerner
 Ellen Roedler
 Siegfried Schürenberg as Dr. Weißbach
 Horst von Otto as Fenske
 Brigitte Wentzel

References

Bibliography 
 Parish, James Robert. Film Actors Guide: Western Europe. Scarecrow Press, 1977.

External links 
 

1956 films
West German films
German musical drama films
1950s musical drama films
1950s German-language films
Films directed by Eugen York
Films about classical music and musicians
Real Film films
Films shot at Wandsbek Studios
1956 drama films
1950s German films
German black-and-white films